Pet Basheerabad is a neighbourhood in Qutbullapur suburb in Hyderabad, Telangana, India. It falls under Quthbullapur mandal of Medchal-Malkajgiri district.

Schools
St. Anns High School, Sherwood high school, have built its campus here.

Colleges
Siva Sivani Institute of Management, has built its campus here.

History
It was named after the Second son of Sikander Jah Mir Akbar ali khan Asaf Jah III or Nizam III Mir Basheeruddin Ali khan (Samsam ud daula).

References

 

Neighbourhoods in Hyderabad, India

Villages in Ranga Reddy district